Michael Seibert may refer to:

Michael Seibert (canoeist), German slalom canoeist
Michael Seibert (figure skater) (born 1960), American figure skater